Villers-le-Bouillet is a municipality of Wallonia located in the province of Liège, Belgium. 

On January 1, 2006, Villers-le-Bouillet had a total population of 6,051.

The municipality consists of the following districts: Fize-Fontaine, Vaux-et-Borset, Vieux-Waleffe, Villers-le-Bouillet, and Warnant-Dreye.

In 1982–1988, it was the first Belgian municipality with a Black alderman (échevin), Donat Ajanohun, born in Benin in 1948.

See also
 List of protected heritage sites in Villers-le-Bouillet

References

External links
 

Municipalities of Liège Province